Events of 2019 in Yemen.

Incumbents
President: Abdrabbuh Mansur Hadi 
Prime Minister: Maeen Abdulmalik Saeed

Events 
 26 March: A hospital in a rural area of northwest Yemen was hit by an airstrike Tuesday killing seven people and wounding eight others, Save the Children said.
 29 August: the Southern Transitional Council take control of Aden and Zinjibar.

Deaths 
 1 January – Jamal Ahmad Mohammad Al Badawi, militant.
 27 March – Abdul Latif Dayfallah, military officer and politician (b. 1930).
 1 August – Munir Al Yafi, military commander (b. 1974).

References 

 
Yemen
Years of the 21st century in Yemen